Robert Chambers (October 23, 1881 – July 22, 1957) was an American biologist, inventor of instruments to dissect living cells.
Chambers was president of the American Society of Zoologists, president of Harvey Society, and president of the Union of American Biological Sciences.  He was also chief of Laboratory of Experimental Cell Research at the Marine Biological Laboratory. Chambers received his Ph.D. from the University of Munich, Germany.

References 

1881 births
1957 deaths
20th-century American biologists
Ludwig Maximilian University of Munich alumni